Moorthy Muthuswamy is an Indian-American nuclear physicist, writer and author.

Moorthy has a doctoral degree in nuclear physics from Stony Brook University, New York. He has published books on political Islam, and in the Third Arvind Ghosh Memorial Lecture delivered in 2005, he called on Hindus to launch a counteroffensive on Islam’s power structure within India due to Indian clerics being "at the forefront of a jihad to convert India into an Islamic country."

His book Defeating Political Islam: The New Cold War was reviewed at Washington Times and the Association for the Study of the Middle East and Africa and received praise from Geert Wilders, Paul Eidelberg, Gary Johnson and Robert Spencer. It has a foreword by Steve Emerson.

In 2015, he proposed the idea that "As in physics, simple explanations may hold the key to understanding emerging global phenomenon such as radical Islam." Since publishing the book, he has written several academic articles pertaining to Islamist extremism. His social science research claims to have shown that religious leaders are using the Sharia "platform" to advance radical agendas that have led to violent extremism in certain communities.

Publications
Muthuswamy, Moorthy S. (2022). Does Sharia Act as both a mediator and moderator in Salafi radicalism? Cogent Social Sciences, 8(1), 1–22.
Whiteside, Craig, Anas Elallame, Moorthy Muthuswamy, and Aram Shabanian (2021). The Islamic State's Department of Soldiers. The ISIS Files
Muthuswamy, Moorthy S. (2018). A Conceptual Framework of Salafi Radicalization: An Underlying Theme and its Enablers. Science, Religion and Culture, 5(1), 51–72.
Muthuswamy, Moorthy S. (2016). The Role of Sharia and Religious Leaders in Influencing Violent Radicalism. Science, Religion and Culture, 3(1), 1-18.
Muthuswamy, Moorthy S. (2014). Sharia as a Platform for Espousing Violence and as a Cause for Waging Armed Jihad. Albany Government Law Review, 7, 347.
Muthuswamy, Moorthy S. "Sharia’s Causal Role in Spawning Violent Radicalism." (2012).
Muthuswamy, Moorthy S. "A Social Experiment in Muslim Radicalism: Contrasting Evolution of Pakistan and India." (2011).
Muthuswamy, Moorthy S. Defeating Political Islam: The New Cold War, Prometheus Books, 2009,

References

External links
Personal page
Moorthy Muthuswamy at Research Gate
 review
 review at Washington Times
review

American political writers
American male non-fiction writers
American social commentators
American critics of Islam
Counter-jihad activists
Hindu critics of Islam
Indian emigrants to the United States
Living people
Year of birth missing (living people)